The 2009–10 season saw Lincoln City compete in Football League Two where they finished in 20th position with 50 points.

Final league table

Results
Lincoln City's score comes first

Legend

Football League Two

FA Cup

Football League Cup

Football League Trophy

Squad statistics

References

External links
 Lincoln City 2009–10 at Soccerbase.com (select relevant season from dropdown list)

Lincoln City F.C. seasons
Lincoln City